The Lincoln County Poor House Farm is a historic poor farm in Lincoln County, Tennessee. It was built in 1874 thanks to Judge Nelson Carter, and the first superintendent was Alexander P. Hayes. The property includes several buildings, including the superintendent's residence, a dormitory for poor whites, a dormitory for poor blacks, and outbuildings. The residents, who included "the poor, aged, mentally incompetent, orphans, and indigent," grew vegetables on the land for their own consumption. The farm became a private residence in 1961. It has been listed on the National Register of Historic Places since July 11, 1985.

References

Farms on the National Register of Historic Places in Tennessee
National Register of Historic Places in Lincoln County, Tennessee
Houses completed in 1874
Poor farms